Finest Hour is an American Metalcore band formed 2005 in Palmdale, California, United States.

History
The band was founded on 26 January 2005 in Lancaster, California. The debut album Intervention was released in 2007 over the Label Divenia Records. The members of the heavy band are from Palmdale and played 2009 three songs live in the Flash Rock webcast show at Flashrock Studios.

Members

Current line-up
 Drew Morelock - Guitar, Lead Strings, Vocals
 Josh Neufeld - Keyboard, Samples
 Erik Gustafson - Guitar, Lead Vocals
 Ryan Morelock - Bass, Strings, Vocals
 Jesse Mallet - Vocals
 Noah Raskin - Drums, Vocals

Former members
 John Thomas - Drums

Discography
2006: Are You Ready for a War? (Promo)
2007: Intervention

References

External links
 Official MySpace

Metalcore musical groups from California
Musical groups established in 2005